The Ministry of Education (MOE) is the governmental body in the Sultanate of Oman responsible for the educational system preceding university education (which is supervised by the Ministry of Higher Education).

External links 
 Ministry of Education

Government of Oman